Peripheral Vision is the second studio album by American rock band Turnover. Produced by Will Yip, the album was released on May 4, 2015 through Run for Cover Records. Following the release of their debut album Magnolia (2013), Turnover parted ways with original guitarist Kyle Kojan, replacing him with Eric Soucy. For Peripheral Vision, Turnover returned to producer Will Yip, who shares songwriting credits on the entire album. It was recorded at his studio, Studio 4, in Conshohocken, Pennsylvania.

The album finds the band shifting from their pop punk origins to a more atmospheric, dream pop-type sound. Peripheral Vision peaked on at number four on Billboard Heatseekers Albums chart, and critical reviews were largely positive, focusing on its stylistic progression.

Background and production
Turnover formed in Virginia Beach, Virginia in 2009 and released their debut album, Magnolia, in 2013.  By that time, the group—composed of vocalist/guitarist Austin Getz, drummer Casey Getz, bassist Danny Dempsey and guitarist Kyle Kojan—had been touring consistently for several years. They felt ready to move the band into a more part-time project if significant steps forward were not made in their sound and performance. Guitarist Eric Soucy joined Turnover in 2014. Danny Randon of Upset wrote that Soucy had a "major influence" on the band's composing process. In March, a four-way split EP was released featuring Turnover, Such Gold, Maker and Ivy League, TX. Turnover's contribution was the song "I Would Hate You If I Could". Bassist Danny Dempsey considered the song their "first step at walking away" from the style of their first album, Magnolia (2013).

In August 2014, it was announced that the band would be working with producer Will Yip. While working in pre-production, Yip was as thrilled with the new material as the group was. Recording took place at Yip's studio, Studio 4, in Conshohocken, Pennsylvania. Yip handled production duties and engineered the sessions, with assistance from Colin Gorman. Yip mixed the recordings with Vince Ratti, and Ryan Smith mastered the album at Sterling Sound in New York City.

Composition
All of the songs that ended up on the album were credited to the band and Yip. The album's sound has been described as indie rock, pop, and dream pop. The shift in sound was unintentional according to singer/guitarist Austin Getz, who noted the band didn't plan on "mak[ing] this kind of record." Getz had been listening to "a lot of stuff from the 1980s, late 70s." He and guitarist Eric Soucy would develop guitar parts individually "and whatever comes out comes out." The ambient humming heard throughout the album is the result of a Superego guitar pedal. The band had bought the pedal to use on their debut album but didn't "utilize it a lot", according to Dempsey. For Peripheral Vision, however, the group employed it extensively, making "everything sound a lot bigger than it really is." Discussing "Cutting My Fingers Off", Dempsey noted that it was about "things [that] will go wrong in your life and at first you'll think it's okay. [...] but then you realize it sucks." Regarding the song "Take My Head", Dempsey revealed it was "about how it could be the best day and you're surrounded by happy things, but you still want to be pissed off and sit by yourself."

Release
On March 10, 2015, Peripheral Vision was announced for release. The album's artwork was also revealed. A day later, "Cutting My Fingers Off" was made available for streaming. In March and April, Turnover supported New Found Glory on their tour of the U.S. On this tour, the band were selling burned CDs of "Cutting My Fingers Off". Despite the fact the album wasn't released by this point, the band played seven songs from it. Referring to their past material, Dempsey revealed that the group "didn't want to play songs we weren't stoked on." Dempsey later remarked that the tour wasn't ideal for the band. A music video was released for "New Scream" on March 30. It was directed by the brother of guitarist Eric Soucy, Rob. "Cutting My Fingers Off" was released as a single a day later. On April 17, "Humming" was made available for streaming. Peripheral Vision was made available for streaming on April 29 and was released on May 4 through Run for Cover. In June and July, the band supported Fireworks on their tour of the U.S. In August, the band supported The World Is a Beautiful Place & I Am No Longer Afraid to Die and Pianos Become the Teeth.

In September and October 2015, the band supported Lydia on their tour of the U.S. In October and November, the band supported The Story So Far. In January 2016, the band toured alongside Citizen in the UK and Europe. Following this, the band tour the U.S. with Citizen again, as well as Sorority Noise and Milk Teeth in March and April. On May 16, a music video was released for "Humming", directed by Rob Soucy. The video features a woman walking through a desert community, which contains "a series of different people including ballerinas, mariachi bands, and other desert eccentrics", according to Noisey. Later in May, the band supported Basement on their tour of Australia and headlined the Ice Grill$ Tour in Japan. In June, the band went on a headlining east coast tour of the U.S. with support from Sports and Secret Space, and a headlining west coast tour of the U.S. in August with support from Triathlon. In early October, the band supported Moose Blood on their tour of the UK. From mid October to early November, the band went on a headlining tour of Europe with support from Sorority Noise and Milk Teeth.

Reception

Peripheral Vision charted in the U.S. on several Billboard charts: number 19 on Alternative Albums, number 4 on Heatseekers Albums, number 15 on Independent Albums and number 28 on Top Rock Albums.

Critically, Peripheral Vision was well received. Exclaim! Branan Ranjanathan  considered Peripheral Vision to be the group's "strongest and most dynamic [work] yet, masterfully incorporating new and adventurous sounds while maintaining the heartfelt authenticity that they've come to be known for." Ian Cohen of Pitchfork commended the band's shift in sound, but criticized what he found as overly obvious lyricism, writing, "Though it’s a warm and often gentle record, not much about Turnover's Peripheral Vision is subtle." Timothy Monger from Allmusic felt the opposite, praising their "improved and far more subtle songcraft." Tyler Sharp, writing for Alternative Press, commented that the band "[has] managed to progress into something entirely unique," complimenting its "subtle-yet-infectious melodies and drowsy (at times dizzying) instrumentals."

Peripheral Vision was listed on Alternative Presss "Best Albums of 2015 so far" list. It was ranked at number 3 on AbsolutePunk's top albums of 2015 list. Stereogum listed "Cutting My Fingers Off" on their "The 5 Best Songs Of The Week" list.

Track listing
All songs written by Turnover and Will Yip.

"Cutting My Fingers Off" – 3:16
"New Scream" – 4:12
"Humming" – 3:58
"Hello Euphoria" – 3:46
"Dizzy on the Comedown" – 4:15
"Diazepam" – 3:19
"Like Slow Disappearing" – 3:55
"Take My Head" – 3:13
"Threshold" – 1:28
"I Would Hate You If I Could" – 4:03
"Intrapersonal" – 3:46

Personnel
Personnel per booklet.

Turnover
 Danny Dempsey – bass
 Austin Getz – vocals, guitar
 Casey Getz – drums
 Eric Soucy – guitar

Production
 Will Yip – producer, engineer, mixing
 Vince Ratti – mixing
 Colin Gorman – assistant engineer
 Ryan Smith – mastering
 Dane McGoldrick – layout

Gear

Signature J Mascis Squier Jazzmaster
Roland JC-120 Jazz Chorus 120-Watt 2x12" Stereo Combo Amp
Fulltone OCD
TC Electronics Polytune 2
Polara Reverberation
Electro-Harmonix Synth Engine

Chart positions

References
Citations

Sources

 

2015 albums
Run for Cover Records albums
Turnover (band) albums
Albums produced by Will Yip